Anguillicolidae is a family of nematodes belonging to the order Spirurida.

Genera:
 Anguillicola Yamaguti, 1935
 Anguillicoloides Moravec & Taraschewski, 1988
 Molnaria
 Skrjabilanus

References

Nematodes